Grand Prairie Stadium (formerly QuikTrip Park and The Ballpark in Grand Prairie) is a cricket ground and former ballpark in Grand Prairie, Texas. Opened in May 2008, it served as the home stadium of the Texas AirHogs of the American Association of Professional Baseball from 2008 through 2019, and of the USL League Two soccer team Texas United from 2017 to 2019.

After the AirHogs folded in October 2020, it was announced that American Cricket Enterprises—the commercial partner of USA Cricket—had acquired the lease to AirHogs Stadium, and planned to redevelop the ballpark as a cricket pitch. The $20 million redevelopment began in April 2022, after which the stadium is expected to host a Dallas-based cricket team in the domestic Twenty20 league Major League Cricket, and serve as a home and training facility for the United States national team.

History 
The ballpark was constructed for the newly-formed Texas AirHogs baseball team; Tulsa-based convenience store chain QuikTrip funded and acquired the naming rights to the stadium, considering it a part of the company's 50th anniversary.

In 2013, its natural grass surface was replaced with Matrix artificial turf. 

By 2016, after the expiration of QuikTrip's naming rights, the park was later referred to as The Ballpark in Grand Prairie or AirHogs Stadium.

In 2017, the AirHogs' ownership group Neltex Sports Group established a new Premier Development League (PDL) soccer team, Texas United, which would play home matches at AirHogs Stadium.

In 2020, the Texas AirHogs opted out of the American Association season due to the COVID-19 pandemic in Texas, and then terminated their membership in the league in October of that year.

Conversion to a cricket pitch 
On November 17, 2020, it was announced that American Cricket Enterprises had signed a long-term lease for the stadium, which will undergo redevelopment to convert it into a facility that can host domestic and international cricket matches, and a Dallas-area team for its upcoming Twenty20 cricket league Major League Cricket. USA Cricket, the US governing body, also announced that the facility would be used as a high-performance training center.

In May 2021, USA Cricket announced that Major League Cricket had been pushed back from 2022 to a 2023 launch due to a "lack of high-quality cricket stadiums" in the United States. It was also announced that the stadium renovations were set to begin the same month, and would last from mid-2022 to summer 2023. With the acquisition of the stadium, Texas United began playing most of their home matches on the campus of the University of Texas at Dallas beginning in the 2021 season.

The renovations include refurbishment and enhancement of the stadium’s 13 luxury suites and Hall of Fame and Officer Club Rooms, installation of "premium seating experiences" around the field, and the renovation and reopening of the stadium’s sports bar facility.  Other cricket amenities such as training nets, batting lanes, and outside turf fields are planned to be added in "subsequent renovation phases". Dallas-based architect HKS was retained by ACE for this stadium, with the Manhattan Construction Company tapped to act as Construction Manager.

In March 2022, ACE stated that it expected to complete the project by March 2023, with the stadium being part of a $110 million investment into new and refurbished cricket-specific stadiums for MLC, and other ventures such as the 2024 ICC Men's T20 World Cup. Ground broke in April 2022, and construction started that July. The project is expected to cost $20 million.

Tenants

Texas AirHogs

The park was built for the Texas AirHogs of the American Association in 2007. They began play (as the Grand Prairie AirHogs) in May 2008 and finished their inaugural season with a final record of 56–40, also winning the Southern Division title before falling to the Sioux Falls Canaries in the finals. A few years later, they would win the 2011 American Association championship by winning a decisive game five at QuikTrip Park. The AirHogs folded in October 2020.

The AirHogs hosted the American Association All-Star Game on July 21, 2009.

Dallas Desire

The Dallas Desire were one of two teams that were introduced to the women's Lingerie Football League (now Legends Football League) in 2004. They played two home games of their 2009 season in Grand Prairie. The team then moved to the Cotton Bowl for the 2010 season.

Texas United 
In 2017, new Premier Development League (PDL) soccer team Texas United announced that they would play their inaugural season at Airhogs Stadium.

Southern Arkansas University Muleriders 
The Mulerider baseball team has used Airhog Stadium to host their Air Hog DII Classic since 2015. This "Classic" has featured several of the top teams in NCAA DII College Baseball. The Muleriders did not return for the 2019 Baseball season.

Other
 NJCAA Region V Baseball Tournament: 2013
 WAC baseball tournament: 2013
NCAA Division II College World Series: 2017

Gallery

References

External links
Texas AirHogs

Buildings and structures in Grand Prairie, Texas
Multi-purpose stadiums in the United States
Minor league baseball venues
Baseball venues in Texas
Baseball venues in the Dallas–Fort Worth metroplex
Sports in Grand Prairie, Texas
2008 establishments in Texas
Sports venues completed in 2008
Soccer venues in Texas
Cricket grounds in the United States